Sergiu Postică (born May 17, 1985) is a Moldovan former swimmer, who specialized in breaststroke events. He is a two-time Olympian (2004 and 2008) and a multiple-time Moldovan record holder in the 100 and 200 m breaststroke.

Postică made his first Moldovan team at the 2004 Summer Olympics in Athens, where he competed in the men's 200 m breaststroke. He edged out Kyrgyzstan's Anton Kramarenko to take a sixth spot and forty-fifth overall by more than a second in 2:27.21.

At the 2008 Summer Olympics in Beijing, Postică qualified for the men's 100 m breaststroke  by eclipsing a FINA B-standard entry time of 1:03.71 from the Russian Open Championships in Saint Petersburg. He challenged five other swimmers on the second heat, including two-time Olympian Nguyễn Hữu Việt of Vietnam. Postică raced to second place by 0.11 of a second behind Panama's Edgar Crespo in 1:03.83. Postică failed to advance into the semifinals, as he placed fifty-fourth overall on the first night of preliminaries.

References

External links
NBC 2008 Olympics profile

1985 births
Living people
Moldovan male breaststroke swimmers
Olympic swimmers of Moldova
Swimmers at the 2004 Summer Olympics
Swimmers at the 2008 Summer Olympics
Sportspeople from Chișinău